Yusuf Hussein Jimaale, popularly known as Madale, is the current and former Mayor of Mogadishu and the Governor of the Banadir region. He was formerly the Secretary of the Peace and Development Party. He first assumed office on November 2, 2015. He was later replaced in April 2017 by Thabit Abdi Mohammed. He was reappointed as mayor of Mogadishu by President Hassan Sheikh Mohamud in September 7, 2022. He succeeded Omar Mohamoud Finish, who had held the office since August 2019.

References

Year of birth missing (living people)
Living people
Somalian politicians
20th-century Somalian people
21st-century Somalian people
Somalian Muslims
Mayors of Mogadishu